Kotitzer Wasser  is a river of Saxony, Germany. It is a left tributary of the Löbauer Wasser, which it joins near Malschwitz.

See also
List of rivers of Saxony

Rivers of Saxony
Rivers of Germany